The 1959 Australian Grand Prix was a Formula Libre motor race held at the Longford Circuit in Tasmania, Australia on 2 March 1959.

The race, which had 13 starters, was the twenty fourth Australian Grand Prix and the third race of the 1959 Australian Drivers' Championship. Stan Jones won his only AGP, breaking through after years of trying with the Maybach series of specials to win in his Maserati 250F, in what would be the last Australian Grand Prix victory for a front-engined car.

The grid for the Grand Prix was determined by race times set in two qualifying races on the Saturday prior to the main race. The first heat was won by Doug Whiteford from Arnold Glass and Bill Patterson. The second heat was won by Jones in a race time almost 20 seconds shorter than Whiteford's, giving him the pole position, from Len Lukey and Alec Mildren.

Classification 

Results as follows.

Notes 
 Attendance: estimated in excess of 30,000 on both days
Pole position: Stan Jones  – fastest heat time of 17m 18s
 Starters: 13
Fastest lap: Arnold Glass  – 2'27 (97.01 mph, 156.09 km/h), new record
 Fastest Eighth: Arnold Glass  – 157.9 mph

References

Further reading
 Con Ryan, Jones Does It at Last, Sports Car World, April 1959, pages 58 & 59

External links
 Stan Jones: Australian and New Zealand Grand Prix and Gold Star Winner…, primotipo.com

Grand Prix
Australian Grand Prix
Motorsport in Tasmania
Australian Grand Prix